Calvin Bellamy (born July 4, 1970), better known as Coo Coo Cal, is an American rapper and truck driver from Milwaukee, Wisconsin. His  single "My Projects" went to #1 on the Billboard Hot Rap Singles chart in 2001.

Coo Coo Cal's first album, Walkin' Dead, was released independently in 1999. Tommy Boy Records released Cal's second album, Disturbed on September 18, 2001. The album spawned Cal's most successful single to date, "My Projects", which topped the Billboard Hot Rap Singles chart.

After leaving Tommy Boy in 2002, Cal released a follow-up to Walkin' Dead entitled Still Walkin'. A fourth album, All or Nothin’, followed in 2004. In 2018, Coo Coo Cal returned to release a new single, “Home”, on Tone Struck Entertainment and a tell-all documentary.

Discography

Albums

Singles

References

External links

Living people
African-American male rappers
Midwest hip hop musicians
Musicians from Milwaukee
Rappers from Wisconsin
Tommy Boy Records artists
Gangsta rappers
1970 births
21st-century American rappers
21st-century American male musicians
21st-century African-American musicians
20th-century African-American people